New Age is a term applied to a range of spiritual or religious beliefs and practices that developed in Western nations during the 1970s.

New Age  or The New Age may also refer to:

Music
 New-age music, a genre of music intended to create artistic inspiration, relaxation, and optimism
 The New Age (album), a 1973 album by Canned Heat
 New Age (Eddy Lover album) (2011)
 New Age (KSI and Randolph album), a 2019 album by KSI and Randolph, or the title song
 "New Age" (Marlon Roudette song) (2011)
 "New Age" (The Velvet Underground song) (1969)
 The New Age, a music group featuring Pat Kilroy

Publications
 The New Age, a British literary magazine 1894–1938
 New Age (Bangladesh), an English-language daily newspaper 
 The New Age (Chicago), an American Norwegian–Danish-language newspaper formerly known as Social-Demokraten
 New Age (South African newspaper), a leftist newspaper (1953–1962)
 The New Age (South African newspaper), a daily newspaper (2010–2018)
 New Age Journal,  a health and lifestyle magazine renamed Body & Soul
 New Age Weekly, the organ of the Communist Party of India

Other uses
 The New Age (film), a 1994 film by Michael Tolkin

See also 
 New Age communities, places with significant numbers of people with New Age beliefs
 New Age travellers, New Age and hippie believers who travel between music festivals and fairs
 New Era (disambiguation)
 New Wave (disambiguation)